Yayantique is a municipality in the La Unión department of El Salvador.

El Tejar de Yayantique is one of the cities within Yayantique.

Municipalities of the La Unión Department